Pir Muhammad Ashraf Rasool is a senior Pakistani politician who is a Member of the Provincial Assembly of the Punjab, from 2008 till January 2023.

Early life and education
He was born on 7 April 1965 in Lahore.

He has the degree of Master of Business Administration which he obtained in 1988 from Australia.

Political career
He ran for the seat of the Provincial Assembly of the Punjab as a candidate of Pakistan Muslim League (N) (PML-N) from Constituency PP-164 (Sheikhupura-III) in 2002 Pakistani general election, but was unsuccessful. He received 18,039 votes but lost the seat to Ali Abbas, a candidate of Pakistan Muslim League (Q) (PML-Q).

He was elected to the Provincial Assembly of the Punjab as a candidate of PML-N from Constituency PP-164 (Sheikhupura-III) in 2008 Pakistani general election. He received 21,888 votes and defeated Ali Abbas, a candidate of PML-Q. From 2008 to 2013, he served as Parliamentary Secretary for Forestry, Fisheries and Wildlife.

He was re-elected to the Provincial Assembly of the Punjab as a candidate of PML-N from Constituency PP-164 (Sheikhupura-III) in 2013 Pakistani general election.

He was re-elected to Provincial Assembly of the Punjab as a candidate of PML-N from Constituency PP-137 (Sheikhupura-III) in 2018 Pakistani general election.

He was chairman overseas commission Pakistan, Parliamentary Director food & also served as Parliamentary Secretary Forest Fisheries Wildlife Tourism Punjab. (2008-2013, 2013-2018) 
He has served as Director Project Dengue along with Health Minister Khawaja Salman Rafique.

References

Living people
Punjab MPAs 2013–2018
Punjab MPAs 2008–2013
Punjab MPAs 2002–2007
1965 births
Pakistan Muslim League (N) MPAs (Punjab)
Punjab MPAs 2018–2023